Collins is a family-owned American forest products company that began in operations July 28, 1855. Headquartered in Portland, Oregon, Collins was the first privately owned forest products company in the United States to have all of its hardwood and softwood forests certified by the Forest Stewardship Council (FSC). In addition to its forests and sawmills, Collins also manufactures siding and trim, particleboard, hardwood, and softwood lumber, and operates retail hardware and lumber yards in northern California. Divisions include: Collins Pine Company, Kane Hardwood, Collins Hardwood LLC, Collins Products LLC, Collins Builders Supply, and the Almanor Railroad.

History

19th century
Truman Doud (TD) Collins began what was later known as the Collins Companies in 1855 at Turkey Run near Whig Hill, Pennsylvania. He and five others, including his brother, Joseph Van Halen (JV) Collins, bought a steam mill and timber from John Alexander. By 1864, TD Collins  bought out the remaining partners including his brother.

20th century

Married to Mary Stanton Collins, they had one son, Everell (ES) Stanton Collins. Following TD's death, Everell took over the company. He moved the company westward, purchasing forestlands in northern California, Washington, and Oregon. By the time he died in 1940, ES Collins would oversee the operations of 15 timber, logging, railroad, and pulp & paper companies in four states, in addition to moving the company headquarters from Pennsylvania to Portland, Oregon.

Following his father, Truman W. Collins became president. During his years in the timber business he began implementing sustainable forest management practices. These practices contributed to the Collins Companies becoming the first privately owned forest products company in the United States to become certified by the Forest Stewardship Council. Truman Collins continued the family's charitable works including founding, among others, the Collins Foundation, the Collins Medical Trust, and the Collins/McDonald Trust.

Following Truman's death in 1963, Truman's brother-in-law, Elmer Goudy took over the presidency, followed by his son, Alan Collins Goudy. Truman's wife, Maribeth Wilson Collins, also became involved in the company, serving first as president of The Collins Foundation and later as Chair of the Board of The Collins Companies.

21st century
In 2005, Maribeth Collins stepped down and her daughter, Cherida Collins Smith, became Chair of the Board of The Collins Companies; Maribeth's son, Truman W. Collins, Jr., became president of the Collins Foundation; and her son, Terry Collins, a forester with the company, became president of the Collins Timber Company.

Environmental commitment 

Collins has committed to being responsible partners in land and resource management with a policy of change through leadership. Collins asserts that third-party, independent certification of forest lands is the best way to ensure the viability of the total forest ecosystem. The company is also a member of Forest Stewardship Council.

In 1997 Collins began integrating the principles of The Natural Step, an international organization dedicated to assisting organizations around the world use a systems-based approach to sustainable practices.  By adopting The Natural Step principles, Collins is working towards bringing sustainability to all their business operations.

As a commitment to land and resource stewardship, Collins joined Climate Leaders, a U.S. Environmental Protection Agency partnership to develop climate change strategies. Collins has committed to reducing greenhouse gases by 18% by 2010.

Sawmill locations 
Collins Hardwood: Kane, Pennsylvania; Richwood, West Virginia
Collins Softwood: Chester, California; Lakeview, Oregon
Collins Pine Particleboard: Klamath Falls, Oregon
TruWood Siding & Trim: Klamath Falls, Oregon

FSC-certified forest locations 
Collins Almanor Forest, softwood: Chester, California
Collins Lakeview Forest, softwood: Lakeview, Oregon
Collins Pennsylvania Forest, hardwood: Kane, Pennsylvania

Retail locations 
Collins Builders Supply: Chester, California; Oroville, California; Paradise, California; Chico, California

Closed locations
Collins Pacific Albus Tree Farm, hardwood: Boardman, Oregon. Closes September 2016.

See also
 List of companies based in Oregon

Further reading 
Collins Pine: Lessons From a Pioneer , Island Press, 1999-06-01.
The Collins Story, 0-97667-772-5, 2005
Zuckerman, Seth. "Old forestry", Sierra. Vol. 77, No. 2, (March/April 1992): p. 44

Notes

External links
The Collins Company Website
Scientific Certification Systems
The Collins Foundation
The Collins Medical Trust
Winderemere Books

Forest products companies of the United States
Companies based in Portland, Oregon
Privately held companies based in Oregon
American companies established in 1855
Manufacturing companies established in 1855
1855 establishments in Pennsylvania